Qarri is a surname of Albanian origin. Notable people with the surname include:

Kristi Qarri (born 2000), Albanian footballer
Musa Qarri (born 1943), 
Albanian artist
Kristjan Qarri (born 1994), Albanian Medical Engineer

See also
Arab Qarri Hajji

Albanian-language surnames